C. tricolor may refer to:
 Caloptilia tricolor a moth species found in China 
 Ciliopagurus tricolor, a hermit crab species native to Madagascar
 Clibanarius tricolor, a hermit crab species found in shallow water of the Caribbean Sea
 Convolvulus tricolor, the dwarf morning glory, a plant species native to the Mediterranean Basin

See also
 Tricolor (disambiguation)